The N1 or Dhaka–Chittagong Highway is a main transportation artery in Bangladesh, between Dhaka and Chittagong. Approximately  in length, the road links the country's two largest cities, Dhaka and Chittagong. The highway is known along various stretches as the Chittagong–Cox's Bazar Highway and the Cox's Bazar–Teknaf Highway. Currently four lanes with a eight-lane expansion underway, the N1 is the busiest road in the country and a top development priority. Construction of a larger Dhaka-Chittagong expressway has been proposed to decrease traffic on the highway.

Background

When constructed, the highway was limited to two lanes of traffic for most of its length. Traffic jams or tailbacks of  have been reported. In 2009, it was estimated that daily usage of the highway was 20,000–25,000 motorised vehicles, up 40% of which were trucks.

The Roads and Highways Department (RHD) of the Ministry of Communication is expanding the Dhaka–Chittagong stretch to four lanes. The target to finish the project by December 2013, however implementation remains slow. The highway forms a critical component of the proposed Asian Highway Network route AH41 and the Central-South-East Asian economic corridor, including initiatives such as BCIM.

Expansion 

In January 2010, expansion of the highway from two lanes to four lanes started. The project will decrease the travel time from Dhaka to Chittagong to 4.5 or 5 hours.

As of March 2013, only 23.5 per cent of work has been completed, and it was unlikely to meet its December 2013 deadline. Construction included 221 culverts, 22 bridges and three flyovers. Reza Construction Ltd. and Sino Hydro have set temporary camps for this purpose respectively near Daudkandi and Chandina.

As of February 2015, the expected completion of the project was postponed until June 2015. And the project completed and opened on July 2, 2016.

Route Description

In Dhaka District 
From Jatrabari to Signboard 6 km in Dhaka District.

In Narayanganj District  
This highway runs on three Upazilas of Narayangaj district. Upazilas are Narayanganj Sadar Upazila, Bandar Upazila and Sonargaon Upazila. From Signboard to Meghna Bridge, total length of N1 highway runs on this district is 19 km.

In Munshiganj District  
The highway exceeded only one Upazila of Munshiganj district and that is Gazaria Upazila. From Meghna Bridge to Meghna-Gomti bridge, total length of highway runs on this district is 11 km.

In Comilla District  
N1 exceeds five Upazilas of Comilla district, Daudkandi Upazila, Chandina Upazila, Burichang Upazila, Comilla Sadar Upazila and Chauddagram Upazila. Length of N1 in Comilla district is 97 km.

In Feni District  
N1 exceeded two Upazila of Feni district, Feni Sadar Upazila and Chhagalnaiya Upazila. Length of N1 in Feni district is 31 km.

In Chittagong District  
N1 exceeds seven upazilas on Chittagong district including Chittagong city. Upazilas are Mirsharai Upazila, Sitakunda Upazila, Boalkhali Upazila, Patiya Upazila, Chandanaish Upazila, Satkania Upazila and Lohagara Upazila. Length of N1 in Chittagong District is 148.06 km.

In Cox's Bazar District  
N1 exceeds four upazilas of Cox's bazar district. Upazilas are Chakaria Upazila, Ramu Upazila, Ukhia Upazila and Teknaf Upazila. Length of N1 in Cox's Bazar District is 148.87 km.

Gallery

See also
 List of roads in Bangladesh

References

N
Transport in Chittagong